Sivar Nordström (11 March 1933 – November 2013) was a Swedish orienteering competitor. He won a bronze medal in the individual event at the 1962 European Orienteering Championships in Løten.

Nordström competed for Tierps IF. He won Tiomila in 1966 together with Mats Lindh, Börje Jansson, Erik Hilmersson, Roland Johansson, Bertil Persson, Hans Nordström, Sivar Nordström, Ingvar Nordström, Tord Lindh and Inge Jansson.  Tierps IF also came second in Tiomila in 1958.

Nordström was a co-founder of O-Ringen in 1965, along with Peo Bengtsson.

Selected publications
Om orsakerna till snytbaggeangrepp på grönrisplanteringar i sydöstra Sverige   
Orientering - idrott - samhälle   
Studier över torkning hos klosslagd, obarkad tallmassaved i fallande längder och standardlängder    
Über die Ursachen der Rüsselkäferschäden an Grünreisigpflanzungen im südöstlichen Schweden

References

1933 births
2013 deaths
Swedish orienteers
Male orienteers
Foot orienteers